Heregel or Herogeel  , is a town located in the western Harawo Zone in the Somali region of Ethiopia in the Awbare district. Jijiga is 48 km south of Heregel, whereas Awbare is 46 km northeast of Heregel. Heregel has the highest altitude in Awbare which is called the "peak of the district" its Altitude about is 2117m.a.s.l. which makes the climate of the town very cool which most of the visitors appreciate.

Demographics
The town and surrounding region is primarily inhabited by the Reer Ugaas subclan of the Makayl-Dheere branch of the Gadabuursi Dir clan.

Filipo Ambrosio (1994) describes Heregel as being predominantly Gadabuursi:
"Jarso and Geri then sought refuge on 'neutral' adjacent Gadabursi territory in Heregel, Jarre and Lefeisa."

History 
According to history, it was established in the 19th Century by Ugasite Kingdom which built the town. Traditionally, it was a center of Somali literature and wisdom in which the notable Poets like Ugas Nur Ugas Roble, Ugas Cilmi dhere, Bokh Ugas, Omer Batun, Abwan Arre, and among others originated. It served, along with the town of Awbare, as the center of the Ugasite Kingdom at the time of Ugas Dodi Ugas Roble.

Socio-economy 
In terms of the livelihood of the inhabitants, 70% are an agro-pastoral community who cultivate the land and crop different types of cereals and cash crops with looking after the livestock (camel, cows and sheep/goat). The remaining 30% of the population depends on the business and commercial activities such as trading and marketing different goods and services. according to the projection-based census in 2015. the total population of the Heregel town and its kebeles was estimated to 65,435 people.

Education 
Heregel has a secondary and preparatory school named after Ugas Dodi and primary and intermediate schools. Similarly, Islamic teaching centers and some other educational institutions are available in the town

Geography 
Under Heregel authority centers including: - -Gobdhahanle, waadhida, cabdho diirshe, daalalay, Nune, jameco, Bardo, Bakaylelay, Tur’awl, Jabsa, Hajinada (Hajin weyne and Hajin yare), Danlahelay, Ges-qabad, Dabagorayo,  Gala-gari, Gogoyti, Ibsa, dhagah-biyale, Warabe-ladag, Hiniin Jeeh, Konta-ade, Shekh-barkhad and like.
All these centers have a high priority for Cultivation and can play a great role for the development of the Region particularly and National at whole.

References

Populated places in Ethiopia